United Nations Security Council resolution 1504, adopted unanimously on 4 September 2003, after recalling Resolution 1503 (2003), the Council appointed Carla Del Ponte as Prosecutor at the International Criminal Tribunal for the former Yugoslavia (ICTY).

The Security Council welcomed the Secretary-General Kofi Annan's intention to nominate Carla Del Ponte, and subsequently approved her appointment for a four-year term, beginning on 15 September 2003.

See also
 Bosnian Genocide
 List of United Nations Security Council Resolutions 1501 to 1600 (2003–2005)
 Yugoslav Wars

References

External links
 
Text of the Resolution at undocs.org

 1504
2003 in Serbia and Montenegro
 1504
September 2003 events